Pyo Ye-jin (born February 3, 1992) is a South Korean actress. Among her representative works are her roles in television series VIP and Taxi Driver.

Career

Pyo Ye-jin worked as a flight attendant from 2011-2013 at Korean Air before she left to pursue acting career. She then enrolled as a trainee actress in JYP Entertainment until 2015. 

Pyo began to get bigger roles from 2016-2017 after she signed to agency Pan Stars Company, with some of the standout works being 2016 KBS2's TV ratings-guarantee family weekend The Gentlemen of Wolgyesu Tailor Shop and 2017 KBS1's daily drama Love Returns where Pyo received her first leading role.

From 2018 onward Pyo has accumulated more notable roles. She won Popular Character Award at the 11th Korea Drama Awards for her role as an enthusiastic rookie secretary in 2018 tvN's rom-com workplace What's Wrong with Secretary Kim. With SBS mystery melodrama VIP, Pyo won Best Character Award at the 2019 SBS Drama Awards for her portrayal of new employee in the VIP team of a luxurious department store. 

Pyo acted in another memorable work with 2021-2023 SBS highly-rated revenge action Taxi Driver and its sequel, as the vigilante team's IT analyst and youngest member.

In January 2023, Pyo signed with Secret Ent.

Filmography

Film

Television series

Web series

Discography

Soundtrack appearances

Awards and nominations

Notes

References

External links

 
 
 

1992 births
Living people
21st-century South Korean actresses
South Korean film actresses
South Korean television actresses
South Korean web series actresses
People from Changwon